{{Automatic taxobox
| image = Nyctinomops macrotus.jpeg
| image_caption = Big free-tailed bat (Nyctinomops macrotis)
| taxon = Nyctinomops
| authority = Miller, 1902
| type_species = Nyctinomus femorosaccus| type_species_authority = Merriam, 1889
| subdivision_ranks = Species
| subdivision =Nyctinomops aurispinosusNyctinomops femorosaccusNyctinomops laticaudatusNyctinomops macrotis}}Nyctinomops'' is a genus of bats in the family Molossidae.

References

 
Bat genera
Taxa named by Gerrit Smith Miller Jr.